Coleophora charadriella is a moth of the family Coleophoridae. It is found in the Ural.

Adults are on wing from late May to June.

The larvae feed on Kochia prostrata. They feed on the generative organs of their host plant.

References

charadriella
Moths described in 1988
Moths of Europe
Moths of Asia